Yulandi van der Merwe (born 19 December 1977) is a South African former cricketer who played as an all-rounder, batting right-handed and bowling right-arm medium-fast. She appeared in 3 Test matches and 18 One Day Internationals for South Africa between 2000 and 2003. She played domestic cricket for Northerns and Nottinghamshire.

References

External links
 
 

1977 births
Living people
Cricketers from Pretoria
South African women cricketers
South Africa women Test cricketers
South Africa women One Day International cricketers
Northerns women cricketers
Nottinghamshire women cricketers